East Union High School (EUHS) is a secondary school located in northwestern Manteca, California. The school first opened in 1964 with a population of 514 students, 26 staff members and four counselors. As of 2005, East Union High School enrolls over 1,600 students annually.

References

External links
 http://mantecausd.net/schools/high-school/east-union
 http://www.greatschools.net/modperl/browse_school/ca/6594

High schools in San Joaquin County, California
Public high schools in California
1964 establishments in California
Manteca, California